Panny may refer to:
Panavision, an American motion picture equipment company specializing in cameras and lenses
Panasonic Corporation, a Japanese electronics manufacturer
Joseph Panny (1796–1838), Austrian composer and violinist
Panny Nikas (born 1988), Australian footballer
The Church of Our Lady Victorious (Kostel Panny Marie Vítězné), a Carmelite church in Prague